Santahar is a railway junction in Adamdighi Upazila in Bogra District of Rajshahi Division in Bangladesh.

History
From 1878, the railway route from Kolkata, then called Calcutta, to Siliguri was in two laps. The first lap was a 185 km journey along the Eastern Bengal State Railway from Calcutta Station (later renamed Sealdah) to Damookdeah Ghat on the southern bank of the Padma River, then across the river in a ferry and the second lap of the journey.  A  metre gauge line of the North Bengal Railway linked Saraghat on the northern bank of the Padma to Siliguri. It was during this period that Santahar came up as a railway station.

In 1899-1900 a metre gauge railway line was constructed between Santahar and Fulchhari, on the western bank of the Jamuna by Brahmaputra-Sultanpur Railway Company.

The Kolkata-Siliguri main line was converted to broad gauge in stages. The Shakole-Santahar section was converted in 1910–1914, when Hardinge Bridge was under construction. The Hardinge Bridge was opened in 1915 and the Santahar-Parbatipur section was converted in 1924. 

In 1971, during the Bangladesh Liberation War, 15000 Biharis in the adjoining town of Santahar were massacred by members of the Mukti Bahini.

See also
 Ahsanganj railway station

References

External links
  Trains from Santahar

Railway stations in Bogra District
Railway junction stations in Bangladesh
Railway stations opened in 1878